Zion Baptist Church is located at 2215 Grant Street in the Near North Side neighborhood of Omaha, Nebraska. The congregation is among the oldest in Nebraska, and has been instrumental for responding to much of the racial tension in Omaha.

History
Founded in 1884, the congregation became the city's largest African American church by the first decade of the 20th century. An incorporation of the church was announced in 1888, the incorporaters were Dr. W. H. C. Stephenson, W. Whitefield, S. H. Baxter, G. W. Kellog, R. Plenix, G. Young, A. Chapman, and D. A. Thomas. The present building was designed by Clarence W. Wigington and built in the wake of the Easter Sunday Tornado of 1913. Zion was integral to the community mobilization that happened previous to and following the Omaha Race Riot of 1919. The local chapter of the National Association for the Advancement of Colored People met there repeatedly to call on local civic leaders to respond appropriately to the violence vetted towards the community, but to no avail.

See also
 History of North Omaha, Nebraska
 African Americans in Omaha, Nebraska
 Racial tension in Omaha, Nebraska

References

External links
 Zion Baptist Church website.

Landmarks in North Omaha, Nebraska
History of North Omaha, Nebraska
Baptist churches in Nebraska
Churches in Omaha, Nebraska
African-American history in Omaha, Nebraska
Religious organizations established in 1884
Clarence W. Wigington church buildings